Mummy Mountain is the name of several mountains in the United States:

 Mummy Mountain (Arizona)
 Mummy Mountain (Colorado)
 Mummy Mountain (Michigan) in Michigan
 Mummy Mountain (Nevada)
 Mummy Mountain (Wyoming) in Wyoming